Poseidon is a 2006 American action disaster film directed and co-produced by Wolfgang Petersen. It is the third film adaptation of Paul Gallico's 1969 novel The Poseidon Adventure, and a loose remake of the 1972 film of the same name. It stars Kurt Russell, Josh Lucas and Richard Dreyfuss with Emmy Rossum, Jacinda Barrett, Mike Vogel, Jimmy Bennett, and Andre Braugher in supporting roles. It was produced and distributed by Warner Bros. in association with Virtual Studios. It had a simultaneous release in IMAX format. It was released on May 12, 2006, and nominated at the 79th Academy Awards for Best Visual Effects. It grossed $181 million worldwide on a budget of $160 million; however, after the costs of promotion and distribution, it lost around $77 million for the studio.

Plot

The  RMS Poseidon, a luxury ocean liner, is making a transatlantic crossing. Former New York City Mayor and firefighter Robert Ramsey is traveling with his daughter Jennifer and her boyfriend Christian Sanders to New York, soon to be engaged. Also on board is former Navy submariner-turned-professional gambler Dylan Johns, architect Richard Nelson, widowed Maggie James and her son Conor, stowaway Elena Morales, waiter Marco Valentine, and Captain Michael Bradford.

As the passengers are enjoying a New Year's Eve party, officers on the bridge see a huge rogue wave bearing down on the ship. To survive the wave, they try to steer the ship to starboard to take the wave bow-first, but she does not turn fast enough. The wave swamps and capsizes the ship, killing the bridge officers along with many passengers and crew. In the ballroom, a badly injured Captain Bradford attempts to restore order and assures the surviving passengers that help is on the way, and tries to persuade them to stay put. Unconvinced, Dylan leads Conor, Maggie, Robert, Richard, and Valentine as they make their way towards the bow, where he believes that they will have the best chance of escaping from the capsized liner.

As they head up, they have to cross an elevator shaft, into which Valentine falls to his death before being crushed by the falling elevator. They reunite with Jennifer, Christian, Elena, and gambler Lucky Larry, who had all been in the nightclub section of the ship, and who are the only survivors out of all of the occupants in the nightclub. The group crosses a makeshift bridge across the lobby, where Lucky Larry gets crushed by an engine. The pressure from the water finally cracks the ballroom windows, drowning the occupants, including Captain Bradford. With the water rising rapidly, the group escapes through an air duct and some ballast tanks, although Elena hits her head underwater and drowns as a result.

With the ship slowly sinking, the survivors soon find themselves in a crew lounge where they find the bow section is flooded, until an explosion of the engine room lifts it out of the water. The group enters the bow thruster room and are horrified to find the thrusters still running. With their path blocked by the propellers, and knowing that the control room is submerged in water, Robert swims away to turn off the engine. He finds the "shut off" switch to be broken, but presses the reverse button instead, before drowning.

With the propellers now spinning in the other direction, Dylan throws an acetylene tank into it, causing an explosion that destroys the propeller, and leaving an opening for them to escape through. The group jumps out the thruster and swims to a nearby inflatable raft, and as they are getting into the raft, the ship starts to sink. As they are paddling away, the waves push the raft farther away from the sinking liner. Poseidon flips back over, and across the water, the survivors look on as she sinks stern-first deep into the ocean. After the survivors fire a flare, two helicopters and several ships arrive to rescue them, having tracked the location of the Poseidon'''s GPS beacon.

Cast

Production
Production on the film began in July 2005.

Sets
As with the 1972 The Poseidon Adventure film, which based many of its sets on rooms aboard the RMS Queen Mary, the film's set designers drew inspiration for some of the spaces aboard the fictional "Poseidon" from rooms aboard Queen Mary 2, most notably in Poseidon's ballroom, which is partly modeled on the one of Queen Mary 2.

On the soundstage at Warner Bros. Studios, Burbank in California, two sets for each main room were built, one right-side-up and the other upside down. The upside-down ballroom was built on top of a large water tank in the soundstage so it could be flooded and drained in a matter of hours. The interior and exterior shots of the ship rolling were constructed with computer-generated imagery.

Visual effects
The primary visual effects were completed by Industrial Light & Magic and Moving Picture Company. ILM used the most advanced version of mental ray to photorealistically light and render the shots, and was responsible for all of the ship's exterior shots. The most complicated work was the opening shot of the ship, where the camera tours the ship's exterior. It lasts for two and a half minutes, and featured one of the most complex digital models ILM had ever created. For water simulations, proprietary software known as PhysBAM was used, created in collaboration with Stanford University. Harold "Howie" Weed was the film's computer graphics modeler.

Digital interiors and water effects were created by MPC, while liquid and gaseous effects were simulated with Scanline VFX proprietary software Flowline. Other shots were done by CIS Hollywood, with water effects simulated using RealFlow.

Soundtrack
The soundtrack was released on May 9, 2006, and includes music composed by Klaus Badelt, as well as songs performed by Fergie, who played the character Gloria in the film, and by Federico Aubele.Be Without You (Moto Blanco Vocal Mix) (8:44) by Mary J. Blige is played in the film but was not included on the soundtrack.

Reception
 Box office 
It grossed $22,155,410 on its opening weekend, for an average of $6,232 from 3,555 theaters, finishing in second place behind Mission: Impossible III. It eventually earned $60,674,817 in the United States and $121,000,000 in foreign markets, for a total gross of $181,674,817. After all costs were factored in, Poseidon lost around $77 million for Warner Bros.

 Critical response 
On the review aggregator website Rotten Tomatoes, Poseidon has a score of 33% based on 203 reviews, with an average rating of 5.00/10. The consensus reads: "This remake of The Poseidon Adventure delivers dazzling special effects. Unfortunately, it doesn't seem that any of the budget was left over to devote to the script". On Metacritic, which assesses films on a score out of 100, Poseidon has a rating of 50 based on 36 reviews, indicating "mixed or average reviews". Audiences polled by CinemaScore gave it an average grade "B" on an A+ to F scale. It was also nominated for the Golden Raspberry Award for Worst Remake or Ripoff, losing to Little Man. However, it was commended for its realistic use of CGI in the capsizing scenes and nominated for the Academy Award for Best Visual Effects, losing to Pirates of the Caribbean: Dead Man's Chest.

Home mediaPoseidon was released to DVD on August 22, 2006, in both single-disc and double-disc editions as well as Full-Screen and Widescreen formats and contains a behind-the-scenes featurette and the theatrical trailer. The 2-disc special edition expands on two bonus features, and also includes the documentaries Poseidon: Upside Down: A Unique Set Design Chronicle; A Shipmate's Diary, which covers a film school intern's experience on the set; and a History Channel documentary which explores rogue waves. Domestic DVD sales for Poseidon'' were $27,196,438.

References

External links

 
 
 
 

2000s disaster films
2006 films
American disaster films
American survival films
Remakes of American films
Films about survivors of seafaring accidents or incidents
Films directed by Wolfgang Petersen
Films set on ships
Warner Bros. films
Films scored by Klaus Badelt
IMAX films
Films set around New Year
Films based on American novels
Films produced by Akiva Goldsman
Sea adventure films
Films shot in Los Angeles
Films set in the Atlantic Ocean
Films based on works by Paul Gallico
2000s English-language films
2000s American films